Chitra Gam is a tehsil and a town in Shopian district of Jammu and Kashmir. It was upgraded to Tehsil under the administration of Shopian district. This village is bounded by Molo, Maladair, Sugoo, and Handhama villages.

Demographics
As per the report of 2011 Census of India, Chitragam is home of 436 householders which extends to 2,634 individuals, of which 1,320 are male and 1,314 are female.

See also
Zainapora
Aglar
Litter
Pulwama
Bijbehara
Anantnag
Shopian

References 

Chitragam is a town in Shopian district which is known for his huge area and population. It is attractive town as it’s covered with apple orchards and small villages.
Chitragam town has almost 1000 plus households presently

Villages in Shopian district